Clear Creek High School may refer to:

Clear Creek High School (Colorado) in Idaho Springs, Colorado
Clear Creek High School (League City, Texas) in League City, Texas
Clear Creek–Amana High School in Tiffin, Iowa
Amanda-Clearcreek High School in Amanda, Ohio
Springboro High School in Springboro, Ohio, now known as Springboro High School